Giering is a surname. Notable people with the surname include:

Frank Giering (1971–2010), German actor
Karl Giering (1900–1945), German Gestapo officer
Konrad Giering (born 1987), South African figure skater